Montes de Oca is a comarca located east of the province of Burgos, in the autonomous community of Castile and León. It is bounded on the north by La Bureba, south by the Sierra de la Demanda comarca, on the east by the province of La Rioja and west by the Alfoz de Burgos.

History
When the Roman legions arrived to the area, it was the territory of the Autrigones tribe.

After the Berber withdrawal, Alfonso II's depopulation (circa 742) and the razzias undertaken at the turn of the ninth century, the Montes de Oca were repopulated mainly by Astures, Cantabri, Visigoths, and Vascones (Basques) in the mid-ninth century, although remained border between the County of Castile with the Caliphate of Córdoba and its allies for at least a century and was afterwards border between kingdom of Castile and the kingdom of Navarre till the mid-twelfth century. During this period the shire to which belonged change from one kingdom to another until finally passed to the kingdom of Castile after an award, in 1146.

Administrative Entities
The comarca capital is Belorado and this small city agrees with its old judicial party, excluding Alcocero de Mola.

Municipalities (26)
The comarca contains the following municipalities:

Minor Local Entities (26)
The name of the municipality the entity belongs to is in parentheses.

Villages (12)

See also

 Province of Burgos
 Comarcas of Spain

References

External links
 website of the Province of Burgos delegation

Comarcas of the Province of Burgos